K. J. Somaiya College of Engineering (KJSCE) was established in 1983 as a college affiliated to University of Mumbai. The college received Autonomous status in 2014 and Since 2019 the college is affiliated to Somaiya Vidyavihar University. It offers 4 year bachelor's degree engineering courses, 2 years postgraduate programme and runs Ph.D research centers  in various disciplines.  KJSCE is situated in Somaiya Vidyavihar University campus  which is spread across approx. 65 acres of posh land. Earlier it was also one of the only 7 autonomous engineering colleges in Mumbai.

Academics
The institute offers nine courses for Bachelors in technology, namely :
B. Tech in Artificial Intelligence and Data Science Engineering
B. Tech in Computer Engineering 
B. Tech in Computer and Communication Engineering
B. Tech in Electronics Engineering
B. Tech in Electronics and Computer Engineering
B. Tech in Electronics and Telecommunications Engineering
B. Tech in Information Technology
B. Tech in Mechanical Engineering
B. Tech in Robotics and Artificial Intelligence Engineering

The postgraduate courses offered include :
M. Tech in Artificial Intelligence & Data Science
M. Tech in Computer Engineering
M. Tech in Electronics Engineering
M. Tech in Electronics and Telecommunication Engineering
M. Tech in Information Technology with Specialization in Information Security
M. Tech in Interdisciplinary program in Energy Engineering
M. Tech in Mechanical Engineering with specialization in CAD, CAM & Robotics
M. Tech in Robotics & Automation Engineering

Ph. D. Programs:
Computer Engineering
Electronics Engineering
Electronics & Telecommunication Engineering
Information Technology
Mechanical Engineering

Apart from this, the institute also runs various Honors, Minors and certificate programs.

Rankings

The National Institutional Ranking Framework (NIRF) ranked it 171 among engineering colleges in 2020.

See also 
 List of Mumbai Colleges
 Karamshi Jethabhai Somaiya

References

External links 
 

Engineering colleges in Mumbai
University of Mumbai